Lake Highlands is a neighborhood constituting most of Northeast Dallas. The neighborhood is a collection of dozens of subdivisions served by Richardson ISD and Dallas ISD public schools, as well as an array of private schools.

Geography

Overview
Lake Highlands touches Richardson on the north, Garland on the east, White Rock Lake and East Dallas on the south, and Lakewood and North Dallas on the west. The neighborhood is bisected from southeast to northwest by I-635 and from southwest to northeast by DART Blue Line. It is bordered on the south by Northwest Highway and White Rock Lake, and on the west by White Rock Creek or Central Expressway. On the north and east, the neighborhood ends at the city limits of Richardson and Garland.

Compass
Relation of Lake Highlands to other places:

Lake Highlands is situated due North of White Rock Lake and East of North Central Expressway.

Topography
The neighborhood differs from much of Dallas and the surrounding area, which is fairly flat. Lake Highlands has hills and valleys, with street elevations that can vary by 50 feet, which offer scenic views of downtown Dallas.

White Rock Lake, a reservoir constructed at the beginning of the 20th century, is located on the south side of Lake Highlands. The lake and surrounding park is a popular destination for boaters, rowers, joggers, and bikers, as well as visitors seeking peaceful respite from the city at the  Dallas Arboretum and Botanical Garden, located on the lake's eastern shore. White Rock Creek feeds into White Rock Lake, and then exits on to the Trinity River southeast of downtown Dallas. Trails along White Rock Creek are part of the extensive Dallas County Trails System.

Subdivisions 
The following neighborhoods are generally considered part of or closely connected with Lake Highlands.

 Abrams Place
 Alexander's Village
 Boundbrook Oaks Estates
 Candlewood Creek
 Caribbean Estates
 Chimney Hill
 Copperfield Community
 Country Forest
 Creekside at Lake Highlands
 Forest Highlands
 Forest Meadow
 Glen Oaks
 Hamilton Park
 Highlands West
 Highland Meadows
 High Oaks Addition
 Jackson Meadow
 L Streets
 Lake Highlands Estates
 Lake Highlands North
 Lake Highlands Square
 Lake Highlands Village West
 Lake Ridge Estates
 Lovely Place Commons
 Merriman Park Estates
 Merriman Park North
 Moss Farm
 Moss Meadows
 Northwood Heights
 Oak Highlands
 Oak Tree Village
 Pebble Creek
 Richland Park 
 Richland Park Estates
 Rolling Trails
 Royal Highlands
 Royal Highlands Village
 Royal Lane Village
 Stults Road
 Town Creek
 Walnut Creek Estates
 Whispering Hills
 White Rock Valley
 Woodbridge
 Woodlands on the Creek
 University Terrace
 Urban Reserve

Demographics
A total of 87,860 people lived in the neighborhood's 14.60 square miles, according to the 2014 U.S. census estimate—averaging 6018 people per square mile. The median age for residents was 34.7.

According to the 2014 Census estimate, 48.2% of the population was White, 30.8% was Black, 6.0% Asian, 15.0% from two or more races. 24.6% of the total population was of Hispanic or Latino origin.

48.8% of residents are male, 51.2% are female. 72.5% are age 18 or over. 34.6% have never been married, 50.0% are married, 4.5% are widowed, and 10.9% are divorced.

The median household income in 2016 was $44,539. 31.8% of Lake Highlands homes are detached, single-family houses. The median owner-occupied home value is $266,181. The average household size is 2.38. Homeowners occupied 39.7% of the housing units, and renters occupied the rest.

Education 
Lake Highlands residents aged 25 and older holding a four-year degree amounted to 36.6% of the population in 2016, considered high when compared with the city and the county as a whole, as were the percentages of residents with a bachelor's or a postgraduate degree.

Public Education 
The Lake Highlands area is one of few areas in Dallas not within the Dallas Independent School District; most of the area is served by the Richardson Independent School District. The RISD portion of Lake Highlands is served by the following schools:

Elementary schools
Aikin Elementary School
Audelia Creek Elementary School
Hamilton Park Pacesetter Elementary School
Forestridge Elementary School
Forest Lane Academy
Lake Highlands Elementary School
Merriman Park Elementary School
Moss Haven Elementary School
Northlake Elementary School
Skyview Elementary School
Stults Road Elementary School
Thurgood Marshall Elementary School
Wallace Elementary School
White Rock Elementary School

Middle schools
Forest Meadow Junior High School
Lake Highlands Junior High School
Liberty Junior High School
High schools
Berkner High School
Lake Highlands High School

Colleges and universities 
Richland College, part of the Dallas County Community College District, is located within Lake Highlands. The school was founded in 1972 and is the largest school in the DCCCD, featuring nearly 22,000 students. Richland is the only community college to receive the Malcolm Baldrige National Quality Award.
Nearby universities

 Southern Methodist University (SMU) is a private, coeducational university in University Park. SMU is the closest university to Lake Highlands, which is home to many of the school's alumni. SMU was founded in 1911 by the Southern Methodist Church and now enrolls 6,500 undergraduates, 1,200 professional students in the law and theology departments, and 3,500 postgraduates. According to sources such as the U.S. News & World Report, SMU is the best overall undergraduate college in the Dallas-Fort Worth Metroplex and the third best in the State of Texas.
 The University of Texas at Dallas (UTD), part of the state public University of Texas System, is located in the city of Richardson and is in the heart of the Telecom Corridor. UT Dallas, or UTD, is renowned for its work in combining the arts and technology, as well as for its programs in engineering, computer science, economics, international political economy, neuroscience, speech and hearing, pre-health, pre-law and management. The university has many collaborative research relationships with UT Southwestern Medical Center. UT Dallas is home to nearly 27,000 students.

Nonprofits 
 Forerunner Mentoring Program is a non-profit specifically dedicated to serving the neighborhood of Lake Highlands. For over 10 years, Forerunner Mentoring has been providing mentorship for boys growing up without a father-figure in the home. What started as just a one-to-one mentoring organization has expanded to additionally provide after-school mentoring programs for K-8th grade boys, a high school ministry for young men, and a women's ministry for the single mothers of the students they serve.

Shopping 
 Lake Highlands Town Center
Nearby shopping
 NorthPark Center
 Galleria Dallas
 Preston Hollow Village
 Upper Greenville

Recreation and parks 

Nestled in the arms of White Rock Creek, Lake Highlands boasts a labyrinth of parks and recreational opportunities, with over 875 acres of parks, 26 miles of trails, disc golf, and several traditional baseball fields, soccer fields, and playgrounds.

White Rock Lake is located on the south end of Lake Highlands. Recreational activities on the lake include kayaking, canoeing and standup paddleboarding, available by rental. The park surrounding the lake features a 9.33 mile trail for hiking, running and bicycling. The White Rock Lake Dog Park is also located on the north side of the lake on Mockingbird Lane.

Government and infrastructure
Lake Highlands is represented by Councilman Adam McGough on the Dallas City Council.  At the State level, Senator Nathan Johnson and Senator Angela Paxton represent the area on the Texas Senate. Representative Ana-Maria Ramos and Representative John Turner serve on the Texas House of Representatives.

The United States Postal Service operates the Lake Highlands Post Office, Northlake Post Office, and Richland Post Office within the Lake Highlands area.

Economy
Lake Highlands is home to the headquarters of Texas Instruments (TI). TI is the No. 4 manufacturer of semiconductors worldwide after Intel, Samsung and Toshiba, and is the No. 2 supplier of chips for cellular handsets after Qualcomm, and the No. 1 producer of digital signal processors (DSPs) and analog semiconductors, among a wide range of other semiconductor products.

Major business areas near Lake Highlands include the Platinum Corridor, Preston Center, and the Telecom Corridor.

Libraries 
Lake Highlands is principally served by the Audelia Road Branch and Forest Green Branch of the Dallas Public Library.  The Audelia Road Branch, built on its current site in 1971, was renovated and expanded in 2004.

Transportation 

As the majority of Lake Highlands was developed in the late 20th century, the primary mode of local transportation is the automobile and the area has a low density compared with neighborhoods built in the early 20th century. Efforts made by the City of Dallas and Dallas Area Rapid Transit to increase the availability of alternative modes of transportation have received varying degrees of support from residents of Lake Highlands. Since 1996, two light rail lines flanking Lake Highlands have been constructed and well received.

Lake Highlands' road network was developed according to the street hierarchy school of urban design. Roads in the area are separated into major limited-access highways, high-capacity principal arterial roads, mid-capacity minor arterial roads, mid-capacity collector roads, and minor streets. The most organized of these systems is Lake Highlands' modified grid plan of principal arterial roads, which runs on a standard N/S/E/W grid.

Highways 
The routing of limited-access highways through Lake Highlands is based on the area's proximity to Dallas' downtown freeway loop, as Dallas' freeway system was built according to the hub-and-spoke paradigm.
  U.S. Highway 75 (Central Expressway) runs northeast/southwest.
Additionally, two separate beltways arc across Lake Highlands: in order from their proximity to downtown:
  Northwest Highway (Loop 12)
  Interstate 635

Thoroughfares 
Major thoroughfares include:

 Abrams Road
 Audelia Road 
 Greenville Avenue
 Royal Lane
 Skillman Street
 Forest Lane
 Walnut Hill Lane
 Walnut Street
 Plano Road

Light rail 
DART's light rail system began serving Lake Highlands in 2001. The Red Line connects Lake Highlands to downtown, Uptown, Richardson, and Plano. The Blue Line connects Lake Highlands to downtown, Uptown, East Dallas, and Garland. The Orange Line runs to DFW Airport, Irving and Las Colinas, Dallas Love Field, the Medical District, Victory Park, downtown, Uptown, Richardson, and Plano.

Lines and stations in Lake Highlands include:

White Rock Station
Lake Highlands Station
LBJ/Skillman Station

 
Forest Lane Station
LBJ/Central Station

Notable Lake Highlanders
Merton Hanks - NFL Pro Bowl and Super Bowl champion defensive back for the San Francisco 49ers football team 
Annie Clark - Grammy Award-winning singer songwriter who performs as St. Vincent
Mark Salling - actor on the television show Glee
C.B. Hudson - lead guitarist for the rock band Blue October
Chris Harrison - Host of the TV show "The Bachelor"
Dan Beebe - former commissioner of the Big 12 Conference
Morgan Fairchild - Film and Television Actor
Gibby Haynes - Lead singer of the band Butthole Surfers and son of "Mr. Peppermint"
Jerry Haynes - aka "Mr. Peppermint", actor and host of long running (1961- 1996) Dallas-based children's television program, Mr. Peppermint Place
Tony Liscio – NFL Super Bowl champion offensive tackle for the Dallas Cowboys

External links 

 Lake Highlands Area Improvement Association
 District 10 Map from the City of Dallas
 City of Dallas, Texas
 Richardson Independent School District
 Dallas City Council District 10

Notes and references 

 Where is Lake Highlands, Texas? Lake Highlands Advocate Magazine 2011